The Hazrat Nizamuddin - Gwalior Express was a mail/express train of Indian Railways, which used to run between Hazrat Nizamuddin railway station of Delhi, the capital city of India and Gwalior Junction railway station of Gwalior, the princely city and educational hub of the Central Indian state Madhya Pradesh. The train was India's fifth ISO Certified train.

The train is no longer operational, running through Hazrat Nizamuddin and up to Jhansi's Taj Express.

Arrival and departure
Train number 12180 departed from Hazrat Nizamuddin everyday at 06:30am IST from platform number 5, reaching Gwalior at around 10:40am IST.

Route and halts
 NIZAMUDDIN
 Agra Cantt.
 GWALIOR JUNCTION

Coach composite
The train consisted of 20 coaches:
 1 AC I Tier
 2 AC II Tiers
 3 AC III Tiers
 6 Sleeper cum chair car Coaches
 4 Unreserved chair cars
 2 Ladies/Handicapped
 2 Luggage/Brake Vans

Average speed and frequency
The train ran with an average speed of 63 km/h.

Loco link
The train was hauled by Ghaziabad WAP 5 Electric engine.

Trivia
The train was extended to Jhansi's Taj Express, with a numbering change taking place along with that extension.

See also
Narmada Express
Indore Junction
Bhopal Junction

References

Express trains in India
Transport in Gwalior
Transport in Delhi
Railway services introduced in 1995
Rail transport in Madhya Pradesh